Krishnan Raghunath is an Indian diplomat who served as the Foreign Secretary of India in the late 1990s. He previously served as the Indian High Commissioner to Bangladesh as well as Ambassador to Russia, Nigeria and the Philippines.

Biography
He graduated from the prestigious Madras Christian College. K. Raghunath went to school at La Martiniere Boys' College in Lucknow, India. 
 
He joined the Indian Foreign service in 1962. He married, Sunny, in 1975.
 In June 1967, Chinese authorities expelled Krishnan Raghunath and Vijai Padmanab two Indian diplomats on charges of espionage. India retaliated by expelling two members of the Chinese embassy in New Delhi.
 From 1978 to April 1979 he was counsellor in the Indian Embassy in Moscow. 
He became Foreign Secretary on 1 July 1997 when he took over from Salman Haidar.

In 2001 he became the Indian ambassador to Russia, taking over from Mr S.K. Lambah.

References

La Martinière College, Lucknow alumni
Living people
Ambassadors of India to Russia
Indian Foreign Secretaries
High Commissioners of India to Bangladesh
Madras Christian College alumni
1939 births